The AFL Women's Grand Final is an annual women's Australian rules football match to determine the AFL Women's (AFLW) premiers for that year. Each year, the winning club receives a premiership trophy and premiership flag; all players in the winning team receive a premiership medallion.

The record attendance is 53,034 set at the 2019 AFL Women's Grand Final.

Method of qualification
In the first two seasons of the AFL Women's (AFLW) competition, the grand final was contested by the two highest-ranked teams at the end of the home-and-away season, as no finals series existed. 

Since the third season, a finals series has been incorporated into the competition as follows:
 In 2019, the top four teams qualified for the preliminary finals, with the two winners playing off in the Grand Final.
 An expanded eight-team finals series was abandoned in 2020 due to the impact of the COVID-19 pandemic.
 In 2021 and 2022 (Season 6), the top six teams qualified for the finals series, which was played under the laws of a single-elimination knockout tournament. 
 In 2022 (Season 7), the Final Eight system used in the AFL was implemented in the AFLW following the league's expansion to include all 18 AFL clubs.

From 2021 onwards, the winners of the two preliminary finals have played off in the Grand Final.

2021 and 2022 (Season 6) process of qualification for AFLW Grand Final

Venues
Unlike the men's Australian Football League (AFL) premiership, which has a customary host venue for the AFL Grand Final every year (that being the Melbourne Cricket Ground), there is no centralised venue that is contracted to host the women's grand final. In 2017 and 2018, the game was technically "hosted" by the minor premier;  and  respectively. However in both cases alternate venues located in the home team's state were used, owing to the unavailability of the Gabba in Brisbane's case and capacity concerns for the Bulldogs home grand final. In 2019 it was hosted by the preliminary final winner with the most premiership points (percentage would have come into consideration if points were the same), as a conference system was in place for this season grand final. The conference-system was abandoned in favour of a single ladder ahead of the 2021 season. Since 2021 the match is played at the highest-ranked preliminary final winner's home venue (or a larger-capacity venue located nearby), with this ranking based on the ladder at the end of the home-and-away season.

Of the four venues to have hosted a grand final, Princes (Ikon) Park, the largest-capacity suburban ground in Melbourne, underwent construction in 2021 and 2022 to turn it into a state-of-the-art precinct that would become the official home of women's football in Victoria, with the idea that all grand finals hosted in Victoria would be played at the stadium.

List of venues to host the grand final

NOTE: There was no grand final held in 2020 due to the impact of the COVID-19 pandemic.

Entertainment and traditions

It is customary for the Grand Final to begin with a rendition of the Australian National Anthem in which both teams line up opposite each other. Most grand finals thus far has been accompanied by a musical entertainment act that has performed before the match or at half-time. At the commencement of the match, an award ceremony is held for individual awards which include best on ground award and premiership medals awarded for each participant. The captains of both sides are invited to make a speech and the cup is presented to the captain and coach of the winning team. Following the ceremonies, players of the winning side assemble on a podium for a team celebration photographs with the premiership cup and premiership medals.

Entertainment
Musicians and groups to have performed at the grand final include Megan Washington in 2017 and Amy Shark in 2019. Australian musician Missy Higgins was booked to perform at the 2018 Grand Final but her gig was cancelled on the day of the match, due to heavy rain and surface conditions at Princes Park. Delta Goodrem performed before the match entertainment at the season seven Grand Final.

Sprint
In 2021 the AFL incorporated a sprint running race (initially known as the Colgate AFLW Grand Final Sprint) into the on-field entertainment on the day of the grand final. In the men's competition, the Grand Final Sprint has been held since 1979.

Best-on-ground
The best-on-ground medal is presented to the player judged as best on the ground during the grand final by a panel of experts.

See also

 AFL Grand Final

References

External links
 

AFL Women's
AFL Women's Grand Finals
2017 establishments in Australia
Recurring sporting events established in 2017
Annual sporting events in Australia